The Krechet-94 (Russian Кречет, meaning gyrfalcon) is a space suit model developed for lunar excursion during the Soviet manned lunar program. It was designed by NPP Zvezda. Development began in 1967, concurrently with the Orlan suit for microgravity spacewalks. The developmental model was known simply as Krechet.

Design features
Weighing 90 kg (198 lb), the suit could operate for 10 hours before requiring a resupply of consumables, and had a total operating lifetime of 48 hours.  The Krechet was the first semi-rigid space suit ever developed, with an aluminum alloy hard upper torso and soft fabric limbs. This design was later adopted by the American EMU and later Russian suits. The Krechet included waist and hip joints which were not present in the Orlan.  The shoulders and wrists of the suit included ball-bearing joints, which allowed for almost 360 degree rotation.

The Krechet was a rear-entry suit, meaning that cosmonauts would enter the suit through a hatch in the back. This entry was easier and more reliable than the use of a zipper. The hatch could then be opened by means of a lever by the right elbow. The life support backpack was incorporated into the hatch. The rear-entry hatch concept is attributed to Zvezda engineer Anatoli Stoklitskii.

The suit featured a chest-mounted control and instrument panel which could fold out for use or fold flat against the chest when not needed.  The suit also featured a metal "hula hoop" ring on the back, which would allow a solo cosmonaut who fell on his back to roll onto his side and use his arms and legs to stand. The suit had two snap-down visors, providing differing levels of sun protection, in addition to a clear visor.  The outer visor was coated in gold for reflectivity.

The suit was designed to be worn over a liquid cooling garment.  The inner fabric of the suit was gray nylon canvas. The suit was insulated with waffle-textured foil. The outer layer was an off-white satin-weave fabric with orange trim.

Because of constraints in shoulder and elbow mobility in the Krechet, the Soviet lunar lander featured a "finger controller" which allowed a suited pilot to operate the lander.  The Krechet would have served as a microgravity suit as well as a surface suit, as the Soviet lunar lander (LK) and command module (LOK) were not designed for intravehicular crew transfer.

Specifications 
Name: Krechet-94/Krechet Spacesuit
Derived from: SKV EVA (developmental) Spacesuit
Manufacturer: NPP Zvezda
Missions: Never used
Function: Lunar extra-vehicular activity (EVA)
Operating Pressure:  
Total Weight: 
Primary Life Support: 10 hours (600 minutes)

Images

References

 http://www.myspacemuseum.com/krechet.htm
 http://www.myspacemuseum.com/sotheby.htm
 
 Krechet at Encyclopedia Astronautica
 https://web.archive.org/web/20090329002339/http://www.astronautix.com/craft/krechet.htm

External links
 Photo of Krechet space suit at Memorial Museum of Cosmonautics in Moscow

Soviet and Russian spacesuits